Mark Cutler is a recording artist and singer-songwriter from Providence, Rhode Island.  Mark Cutler has been the lead singer and songwriter for The Schemers, The Raindogs, and The Dino Club.

References

External links

Year of birth missing (living people)
Living people
Musicians from Providence, Rhode Island
American rock singers
The Raindogs members